Kristin Dutrow Baker (born 1963) is a Republican member of the North Carolina House of Representatives. She has represented the 82nd district (including constituents in Cabarrus County) since her initial appointment in March 2020.

Life and career
Baker earned her bachelor's degree in 1985 from the University of North Carolina at Chapel Hill as a Morehead-Cain Scholar, and her medical degree in 1989 from the University of North Carolina at Chapel Hill School of Medicine. Baker practices psychiatry in Concord, North Carolina.

Committee assignments

2021-2022 session
Appropriations (Vice Chair)
Appropriations - Health and Human Services (Chair)
Health (Chair)
Education - Universities
Families, Children, and Aging Policy
Insurance
UNC BOG Nominations

Electoral history

2020

References

Living people
1963 births
Place of birth missing (living people)
People from Concord, North Carolina
University of North Carolina at Chapel Hill alumni
American psychiatrists
Women state legislators in North Carolina
21st-century American politicians
21st-century American women politicians
Republican Party members of the North Carolina House of Representatives